Berlin Gesundbrunnen station is a railway station in Berlin, Germany. It is situated in the Gesundbrunnen district, part of the central Mitte borough, as an interconnection point between the northern Ringbahn and Nord-Süd Tunnel lines of the Berlin S-Bahn, as well as a regional and long distance station of the Deutsche Bahn network. The station is operated by the DB Station&Service subsidiary of Deutsche Bahn AG and is classified as a Category 1 station, one of 21 in Germany and four in Berlin, the others being Berlin Hauptbahnhof, Berlin Südkreuz and Berlin Ostbahnhof.

History

When the Berlin–Stettin railway was opened in 1842, the tracks ran farther northwestwards with a hazardous level crossing on Badstraße. Nearby Gesundbrunnen station was inaugurated on 1 January 1872 with the northern Ringbahn line; it became an important railway hub with the opening of the Berlin Northern Railway to Neubrandenburg; the junction was finished on 10 July 1877. From 1 May 1897, it also offered access to the Berlin–Stettin line, whose original tracks were shifted southwards to meet the parallel Ringbahn here.

On 8 August 1924 Gesundbrunnen was one of the first stations to become part of the Berlin S-Bahn system when third rail trains ran from Stettiner Bahnhof to Bernau. After the opening of the Nord-Süd Tunnel in 1939, trains ran from Gesundbrunnen via Humboldthain station and Stettiner Bahnhof directly to Anhalter Bahnhof in the south.

Designed in a New Objectivity style according to plans by Alfred Grenander with a separate reception building, the U-Bahn platform crossed deep beneath the railway tracks and served as an air-raid shelter during the bombing of Berlin in World War II.

World War II and Cold War
On 3 February 1945, this station was destroyed by an air raid.

After World War II and the division of Berlin, long-distance train service diminished and was finally discontinued on 18 May 1952. The S-Bahn system was also affected by the construction of the Berlin Wall in 1961, when the network was partitioned into an eastern and western half. When the wall was built, it became a terminus for the Berlin Ringbahn, because of the breakup. Its services are Sonnenallee/Köllnische Heide and Gesundbrunnen. Bernau and Helligensee service were merged into Helligensee and Waidmannlust - Lichterfelde and Lichtenrade services, because Bornholmer Straße was also closed due to the Berlin Wall construction.

Because of the strike, Lichtenrade – Frohnau and Lichterfelde Süd – Heiligensee were the only ones left from 1980 to 1984. And it was replaced, although it remains the same for Lichtenrade to Frohnau, and Anhalter Bahnhof to Wannsee until the German reunification in 1990.

Fall of the Berlin Wall

After German reunification in 1990, Gesundbrunnen was rebuilt extensively - it did delay the reopening of the rapid transit link to Berlin Schönhauser Allee station until 17 September 2001. The last stretch, from Westhafen to Gesundbrunnen was reopened on 15 June 2002.

In the Pilzkonzept master plan the station was modernized as Berlin's northern long-distance train station and during 2005 there were discussions to rename the station to Nordkreuz (North Cross) reflecting the names of the other connection stations on the Ringbahn namely Ostkreuz (East Cross), Südkreuz (South Cross) and Westkreuz (West Cross). Work on the railway hub was completed on 26 May 2006, with no development on the rename until 2016, when Nordkreuz was appended to Gesundbrunnen as an official alternative name.

Despite its station category 1 the station had no representative entrance building - the old entrance building had been demolished and it had never been replaced giving the new station a peculiar appearance. The area designated for the entrance building was left as a public open space (Hanne-Sobek-Platz). The planning was stopped not only by financial cuts but also due to the existence of the nearby Gesundbrunnen-Center shopping center that was opened in 1997 offering 25000 square meters of shopping facilities plus a direct connection to the railway station. The planning resumed during 2010 and construction work on a new entrance building began by the end of 2011, with the 3300 square meters projected to cost a total of 7.4 million euros. The new entrance building opened in autumn 2015.

Train services

National and Regional services
The station is served by the following service(s):

Intercity Express services (ICE 10) (Bonn -) Köln - Wuppertal - Hamm - Hannover - Berlin
Intercity Express services (ICE 10) (Köln/Bonn Airport -) Düsseldorf - Essen - Dortmund - Hamm - Hannover - Berlin
Intercity-Express service (ICE 28) (Stralsund - Eberswalde -) Berlin - Halle - Jena - Nuremberg - Munich
Intercity-Express service (ICE 1005) Berlin - Halle - Erfurt - Nuremberg - Munich
Intercity service (EC 27) Binz - Stralsund - Eberswalde - Berlin - Dresden - Prague
Intercity service (IC 50) Binz - Stralsund - Eberswalde - Berlin - Halle - Erfurt - Frankfurt (Main)
Regional services  Stralsund - Greifswald - Pasewalk - Angermünde - Berlin - Ludwigsfelde - Jüterbog - Falkenberg - Elsterwerda
Regional services  Schwedt - Angermünde - Berlin - Ludwigsfelde - Jüterbog - Lutherstadt Wittenberg
Regional services  Rostock - Neustrelitz - Berlin - Wünsdorf-Waldstadt - Elsterwerda
Regional services  Stralsund - Neustrelitz - Berlin - Wunsdorf-Waldstadt - Elsterwerda
Regional services  Berlin – Hennigsdorf – Neuruppin – Wittstock – Pritzwalk – Wittenberge 
Regional services  Berlin – Eberswalde – Angermünde – Szczecin Głowny
Local services  Berlin - Karow - Basdorf - Groß Schönebeck / Wensickendorf (- Schmachtenhagen)

S- and U-Bahn services
Gesundbrunnen is a station on Berlin S-Bahn and Berlin U-Bahn networks. The station is served by the following services:

 S1 (Oranienburg - Frohnau - Wittenau - Gesundbrunnen - Friedrichstraße - Schöneberg - Rathaus Steglitz - Wannsee)
 S2 (Bernau - Karow - Pankow - Gesundbrunnen - Friedrichstraße - Südkreuz - Blankenfelde)
 S25 (Hennigsdorf - Tegel - Gesundbrunnen - Friedrichstraße - Südkreuz - Teltow Stadt)
 S26 ( Waidmannslust  -  Wittenau  - Gesundbrunnen - Friedrichstraße - Südkreuz - Teltow Stadt)
 S41 (Ring Clockwise) (Gesundbrunnen - Ostkreuz - Treptower Park - Hermannstraße - Südkreuz - Innsbrucker Platz - Westkreuz - Westend - Gesundbrunnen)
 S42 (Ring Anti-clockwise) (Gesundbrunnen - Westend - Westkreuz - Innsbrucker Platz - Südkreuz - Hermannstraße - Treptower Park - Ostkreuz - Gesundbrunnen)
 U8 (Wittenau - Osloer Straße - Gesundbrunnen - Alexanderplatz - Hermannstraße'')

References

External links

Berlin S-& U-Bahn network map
S-Bahn station information 
Long distance/Regional station information

Berlin S-Bahn stations
Railway stations in Berlin
U8 (Berlin U-Bahn) stations
Buildings and structures in Mitte
Railway stations in Germany opened in 1871
Railway stations in Germany opened in 1930